Mohammed Tahir Monguno (born 12 February 1966) is a Nigerian lawyer and member of the Federal House of Representatives, representing Marte-Monguno-Nganzai Federal Constituency of Borno State, Nigeria. He is currently the majority chief Whip of the 9th House of Representatives.

Background
Mohammed Tahir Monguno was born on February 12, 1966. He had his primary education in Monguno Central Primary School and later attended Government Secondary School (GSS) Ngala, Borno State where he obtained his Senior School Certificate. He studied law in the University of Maiduguri where he graduated in 1989. He attended Nigerian Law School and was called to the Nigerian Bar in 1990. He contested and was elected as a member of the House in 1992 at the age of 26 years.

He returned to the House of Representatives as an elected member since 2007, representing Marte/Nganzai/Monguno federal constituency in Borno State. He has been a member of the 6th, 7th, 8th and the 9th assembly where he is currently the Majority Chief Whip. Before 2007, he served as Honorable Commissioner for Justice and Attorney General of Borno state between 2003 and 2005. He also had a small stint as Honorable Commissioner for Education (2005-2006) and Honorable Commission for Water Resources (2006 - 2007) both in Borno state. Prior to his appointment as a commissioner in 2003, he had a career in private legal practice. He was the Principal Solicitor at Monguno Kura Chambers between 1992 and 2003. He was also a senior lecturer of law at Borno State College of Legal Studies (now Mohammed Goni College Of Legal and Islamic Studies) up until 1999. In 2000, he served as a committee member on the Application of Sharia law in Borno State.

Political career
Monguno, a member of the ruling All progressive congress (APC) emerged winner at the 2019 general elections to return to the lower chamber for the fourth consecutive term to represents Marte, Monguno and Nganzai Federal Constituency of Borno state.
He was previously elected to the House of Representatives in 1992 where he represented the Marte, Monguno and Nganzai federal constituency of Borno state before the presidential election of June 12, 1993 was annulled leading to the abrupt end of the tenure of all elected representatives.

Speakership race

In 2015, during the House leadership tussle of the 8th assembly, Monguno who initially aspired for the leadership of the House stepped down to run for the post of deputy speaker under a joint ticket with Femi Gbajabiamila. However, he was defeated by Hon. Sulaiman Lasun.

In the 9th assembly that began in 2019, Monguno was initially one of the top contenders for the position of the Speaker House of Representatives of Nigeria, within the APC caucus. However, he later withdrew from the race to endorse and support Femi Gbajabiamila who was the choice of the party.

House Committee membership and chairmanship

1991–1992
Vice-chairman, Committee on Foreign Affairs

2007–2011
Chairman, Committee on FCT Council Areas
Member, Committee on Communications

2011–2015
Chairman, Committee on Agriculture
Member, Committee on Public Petitions
Member, Committee on Power

2015–2019
Chairman, Committee on Agriculture
Member, Committee on Constitutional Review

Legislative activities
Monguno moved the motion along with 14 other representatives which asked the President to sack the Service Chiefs due to the worsening security situation in the country and their inability to address the incessant attacks by Boko Haram insurgents in the North East zone. In a similar move, he moved the motion asking the Federal Government to declare emergency on security.

In May 2020, he also sponsored the bill for an Act to alter the 1999 constitution to allow for Independent candidacy into any elective office in Nigeria. He argued that the bill will give all Nigerians a level playing ground to contribute their quota to national and local development. However the bill was opposed by Hon. James Faleke who argued that it would be a daunting task for INEC and it will result in a lot of litigation.

References 

1966 births
Living people
Nigerian Muslims
Political office-holders in Nigeria